Cabugao (locally known as Cabugao Gamay and sometimes called Cabugao Daku or Cabugao Islet) is a small, uninhabited island in northeastern Iloilo, Philippines. It is one of fourteen islands politically administered by the municipality of Carles. Along with Bantigui Island and Antonia Island, it is one of three minor southern islets in the Islas de Gigantes archipelago.

Location and geography 

Cabugao is a small island northeast of the Panay Island coast in the Visayan Sea. Cabugao is a widely photographed island in Isla de Gigantes and is often part of island-hopping tours of the archipelago. It features two white sand beaches that forms like a sandbar connecting two islets.

See also

 List of islands in the Philippines
 List of islands
 Desert island

References

External links
 Things to Do in Isla de Gigantes

Islands of Iloilo
Uninhabited islands of the Philippines
Beaches of the Philippines